Kamphaeng Saen is the northwesternmost district (amphoe) of Nakhon Pathom province, central Thailand.

History
Kamphaeng Saen was a moated centre of Dvaravati culture, dating from 410-870 CE, with the foundation of a Buddhist stupa identified.

Geography
Neighbouring districts are (from the north clockwise): Song Phi Nong of Suphanburi province; Bang Len, Don Tum, and Mueang Nakhon Pathom of Nakhon Pathom Province; Ban Pong of Ratchaburi province; and Tha Maka of Kanchanaburi province.

Kasetsart University's Kamphaeng Saen campus is in this district.

Administration
The district is divided into 15 subdistricts (tambons), which are further subdivided into 202 villages (mubans). Kamphaeng Saen is also a township (thesaban tambon), which covers parts of tambons Kamphaeng Saen and Thung Kraphang Hom.

References

Kamphaeng Saen